Luxi Town  is a township-level division of Pinghe County, in the south of Fujian Province, China.

Luxi Town is located in the mountainous northwestern corner of Pinghe County. In the north and west, its territory borders on Nanjing County and Yongding County.

The town's name comes from the eponymous creek (Luxi, literally, "Reed Creek"; cf. Lugou Bridge in Beijing), which flows here into the  Mei River (Meihe; not to be confused with Meijiang, of the same system). The Meihe flows to the southwest, eventually leaving Fujian and entering Guangdong, where it becomes known as the Meitan River and becomes one of the 3 rivers whose confluence forms the Han River. The town is served by Fujian Provincial Highway 309 (S309).

See also
List of township-level divisions of Fujian

References

Township-level divisions of Fujian
Zhangzhou